Peter James Wallace (born 16 October 1985) is a former Scotland international rugby league footballer who played for the Penrith Panthers and the Brisbane Broncos in the NRL.

He announced his immediate retirement following a string of injuries on 12 June 2018. He now works as an assistant coach for the Penrith Panthers.

Background
Wallace was born in Melbourne, Victoria, Australia, and raised in Blaxland, New South Wales by his mother Dianne. Wallace has never met his father, who reportedly remained in Melbourne.

He attended Blaxland East Public School and Blaxland High School, and played his junior rugby league for Lower Mountains Eagles before moving to St Marys Saints at the age of 12. He also played some of his junior rugby league at the Carlingford Cougars.

Wallace is of Scottish descent through his maternal grandmother.

Playing career

Penrith Panthers
Wallace made his NRL début at Canberra Stadium against the Canberra Raiders in Round 17 of the 2005 season.

He did not feature throughout the entire 2006 NRL season for Penrith.

In Round 3, 2007, against the Brisbane Broncos, Wallace kicked a 44-metre field goal in golden point, with Penrith winning 29–28.

Wallace was the subject of controversy when he was dropped to NSWRL Premier League in Round 15 of the NRL competition in 2007. Penrith coach Matthew Elliott moved Wallace to the premier league on what he claimed to be poor form. However Wallace had earned a man of the match award only two weeks before, but had a poor game the week later.

The controversy came when claims were made that Wallace was dropped due to the fact that he had signed with the Broncos, but teammate Joel Clinton, who was also Brisbane bound, wasn't dropped. There were rumours from the media, that Wallace wanted out of the Penrith Panthers to go to Brisbane mid-season. Wallace denied these claims, and wanted to fulfill his contract with the Penrith club, even if it was in premier league.

It remains unclear how the move to the Brisbane club came about.

Brisbane Broncos
Wallace's career at the Brisbane Broncos started in 2008. He guided his new club to a first round victory over his old club, the Penrith Panthers, before picking up consecutive "Man of The Match" awards in his next two matches, also wins for Brisbane. Wallace performed very strongly while Darren Lockyer was injured and provided much needed stability in Brisbane's halves and a good kicking game.

Wallace was selected for the City vs Country Origin match in 2008. In May, 2008, Wallace was selected as halfback for New South Wales for game I of State of Origin on 21 May at ANZ Stadium. With his first touch of the ball, he made a line break. He also had a hand in two tries and placed a pin point accurate kick for Anthony Quinn to score the second try of the night. He made only one error and took many hits from Queensland players, making 29 tackles.

Wallace was selected for the Blues again in Game II (playing on his normal home ground) before he ruptured a testicle and missed Game III. After State of Origin ended Wallace was reunited with halves partner Darren Lockyer at the Broncos. Wallace's great form from the start of the season had slightly been lost but he still remains to be a future star and a great prospect for the Brisbane Broncos. On 15 July 2008, Wallace extended his contract with the Brisbane Broncos until 2012.

On 20 October 2008, Wallace was arrested after a scuffle with security at a pub in Mooloolaba, Queensland, where it was believed he was celebrating his 23rd birthday.

He was selected for NSW City in the City vs Country match on 8 May 2009. Later in the month he was named in the 17-man squad to represent New South Wales in the opening State of Origin match on 3 June 2009, in Melbourne.

Wallace was injured at the time of Brisbane's 2009 post-Origin slump and upon his return the club enjoyed its best winning streak in five years, reaching the finals. However, in Brisbane's second play-off win Wallace broke his ankle, meaning he would miss the grand final qualifier.

At the end of the 2013 NRL season, Wallace was selected to represent Scotland at the 2013 Rugby League World Cup held in Europe.

Return to Penrith
Wallace played for the Penrith Panthers again from the 2014 NRL season. He sustained a season-ending ruptured anterior cruciate ligament on his left knee on 27 July 2014.

Wallace finished off the 2015 NRL season playing 13 games and scoring 2 tries

In Round 9 of the 2016 NRL season, Wallace kicked the match winning field goal in Penrith's 19-18 win against the Canberra Raiders. Wallace would return to the hooker role after James Segeyaro was dropped to NSW Cup. Wallace played his 200th NRL career game in Round 16, against the South Sydney Rabbitohs in Penrith's 28-26 win. Playing well at his new found position, Wallace signed a two-year deal with the club on 25 July 2016, extending his contract with the Panthers to the end of 2018. Playing an instrumental part in helping Penrith reach the finals, he finished off the year as the Penrith club's most experienced player and their first-choice hooker. He played in all 26 games scoring 5 tries, kicking 3 goals, and 1 field goal.

He played 19 games in 2017 NRL season, scoring two tries.

On 12 June 2018, Wallace announced his retirement from the NRL effective immediately. The Penrith club released a statement in which general manager Phil Gould praised the 32-year-old for his "incredibly selfless act". Gould also revealed Wallace had played the last two seasons with no anterior cruciate ligament (ACL) after a failed knee reconstruction. Wallace joined Penrith's coaching staff immediately as he transitioned into life after playing.

Scotland 
Eligible through his maternal grandmother, Wallace was unable to represent Scotland at the 2008 World Cup due to treatment for injuries. 

He made his international début at the 2013 World Cup, playing at halfback in all four of Scotland's matches.

Wallace was unavailable for the 2016 Four Nations due to an elbow injury sustained at the end of the 2016 NRL season.

The following year, Wallace was forced to withdraw from Scotland's 2017 World Cup squad to recover from numerous injuries obtained throughout the 2017 NRL season.

Statistics

Footnotes

External links

Penrith Panthers profile
(archived by web.archive.org) Peter Wallace at the Brisbane Broncos official website

1985 births
Living people
Australian people of Scottish descent
Australian rugby league coaches
Australian rugby league players
Brisbane Broncos players
New South Wales City Origin rugby league team players
New South Wales Rugby League State of Origin players
Penrith Panthers captains
Penrith Panthers players
People from the Blue Mountains (New South Wales)
Prime Minister's XIII players
Rugby league five-eighths
Rugby league halfbacks
Rugby league hookers
Rugby league players from Melbourne
Scotland national rugby league team players